Hawley House may refer to:

in the United States
(by state then city or town)
Thomas Hawley House, Monroe, Connecticut, listed on the National Register of Historic Places (NRHP) 
Ephraim Hawley House, Trumbull, Connecticut, NRHP-listed in Fairfield County
Gideon Hawley House, Barnstable, Massachusetts, NRHP-listed
Hildreth-Lord-Hawley Farm, Pittsford, New York, NRHP-listed
Stewart-Hawley-Malloy House, Laurinburg, North Carolina, NRHP-listed in Scotland County
Hawley's Ferry House, Ferrisburg, Vermont, NRHP-listed in Addison County